La Chapelle-Craonnaise is a commune in the Mayenne department in north-western France.

Geography
The river Oudon forms most of the commune's north-western border.

See also
Communes of the Mayenne department

References

Chapellecraonnaise